The Agni-III (IAST: Agni) is an Indian intermediate-range ballistic missile inducted into service in 2011 as the successor of the Agni-II.

Introduction

India's credible minimum deterrence envisaged a nuclear triad of counter-strike capability which required a long-range missile to provide robust second strike capability. India developed a larger missile, with a heavier payload and longer range in a compact configuration. Driven by the need for retaliation to defeat emerging anti-ballistic missile (ABM) defence and countermeasures, this capability requires a compact missile which can carry ABM payloads and weapons in a configuration similar to a MIRV.

Description

The Agni-III was developed as the successor to the Agni-II. Designed by the Defence Research and Development Organisation (DRDO), Agni-III is a two-stage ballistic missile capable of nuclear weapons delivery. DRDO formed a separate propulsion plant in September 2001 to develop large-sized solid-propellant rocket engines, including the infrastructure for propellant casting. The stubby, two-stage solid-fuel missile is compact enough for easy mobility and flexible deployment on a number of surface and sub-surface platforms.

The missile is equipped with sophisticated navigation, guidance and control systems and advanced on-board computer systems. The electronic systems are designed to withstand greater vibration, heat and noise. A high-performance, indigenous ring laser gyro-based inertial navigation system was flight-tested for the first time on 7 Feb 2010.

The ground support system and launcher are developed by Research & Development Establishment (Engineers).

The circular error probable (CEP) of Agni-III is within . The US Air Force's National Air and Space Intelligence Center estimated that in June 2017, fewer than 10 launchers had been deployed.

Propulsion 

The first-stage booster weighs around 32 tonne and is made of advanced carbon-composite materials to provide high payload fraction (mass fraction).

Flight tests 
The first test of the Agni-III was conducted on Abdul Kalam Island (then known as Wheeler Island), near the Bhadrak coast, on 9 July 2006. The launch was unsuccessful; the missile fell into the sea off the coast of Odisha, short of the target. According to the Defence Research and Development Organisation, the failure was due to a first-stage anomaly of recirculating hot gases which entered the missile-base shroud and damaged electronic components. Indian Defence Minister Pranab Mukherjee called it a "partial success" (a euphemism indicating that the test generated useful data for diagnosis and correction), since the missile was air-borne for five minutes instead of the expected 15.

Agni-III was successfully test-fired on 12 April 2007 from Abdul Kalam Island, off the coast of Odisha. India's Cabinet Committee on Security announced, "This test confirms the extent of India's nuclear reach and India's nuclear deterrence as the missile can accurately hit targets at distance more than 3000 km away". The Agni-III is the most powerful and capable of India's missile inventory; capable of carrying a variety of warheads (including nuclear warheads), it can be launched from a number of platforms and extends India's regional power projection.

The missile was again test-fired successfully on 7 May 2008. After a flight of about 15 minutes, defence scientists confirmed that the test was successful and the missile met all requirements.
lethality. The successful 2008 test opened the door for the next-generation Indian ICBM Agni V, with a  range. The Agni-III's development test was postponed for unknown reasons in August 2009.

It was again tested successfully on Abdul Kalam Island in Odisha on 7 February 2010. The missile hit the target accurately (witnessed by two ships near the target), and met all mission objectives. The two-stage, solid-fuel missile is small enough for easy mobility and flexible deployment from a number of surface and sub-surface platforms. The test validated its nuclear-triggering mechanism, indicating that the Agni-III is intended for strategic nuclear deterrence. The test launch was part of the missile's pre-induction into the Indian Army.

India's defence minister announced in August of that year that the Agni-III was ready for induction into the country's armed forces, and its induction was reported in June 2011. In September 2012, it was reported that a missile group of Agni-IIIs was being raised.

On 21 September of that year, the Strategic Forces Command successfully test-fired an Agni III missile from a rail mobile launcher. The missile was again successfully tested on 23 December 2013, on 16 April 2015, and on 27 April 2017.

On 30 November 2019, the missile's first night trial was conducted. The test reportedly failed, with the missile beginning to diverge from its planned flight trajectory after  and mission control aborting the flight. A manufacturing defect was thought to be a possible cause of the failure.

References

External links 
CSIS Missile Threat - Agni 3
Bharat-Rakshak Home
Bharat-Rakshak Missiles Section: AGNI – Strategic Ballistic Missile
Video of Agni-III test

Ballistic missiles of India
Intermediate-range ballistic missiles
Military equipment introduced in the 2010s
de:Agni III